Two Against Nature is the eighth studio album by American rock band Steely Dan. Their first studio album in 20 years, it was recorded from 1997 to 1999 and released on February 29, 2000, by Giant Records.

A critical success, Two Against Nature won the group four Grammy Awards: Album of the Year, Best Pop Vocal Album, Best Engineered Album – Non-Classical, and Best Pop Performance by a Duo or Group with Vocals (for the single "Cousin Dupree"). Commercially, it peaked at number six on the U.S. Billboard 200 chart and sold more than one million copies, earning a Platinum certification from the Recording Industry Association of America.

Reception and legacy 

Two Against Nature was met with both commercial and critical success. At Metacritic, which assigns a normalized rating out of 100 to reviews from professional critics, the album received an average score of 77, based on 13 reviews, indicating "generally favorable reviews". Writing in March 2000 for The Village Voice, Robert Christgau applauded the music as an excellent "rock comeback" and a "jumpier and snappier, sourer and trickier and less soothing" iteration of the jazz pop featured on Steely Dan's 1977 album Aja, describing it as "postfunk". Thematically, he found it unified by fictitious yet revelatory accounts of "dirty old men" seeking "validation" and "excitement" in their sex lives, which are "full of heady infatuations and random acts of cruelty, self-interest and self-hate, vicious cycles blowing hot and cold", all conveying "the urgency of attraction". Stephen Thomas Erlewine of AllMusic appreciated the "sharp humor" in the lyrics, but was especially impressed by the music's "depth and character", as he observed "nearly endless permutations within their signature sound". A dissenting view came from Pitchfork reviewer Brent DiCrescenzo, who dismissed the songs as "lengthy, indistinguishable" and "glossy bop-pop" while suggesting Steely Dan lack "soul".

At the 2001 Grammy Awards, Two Against Nature earned Steely Dan wins in the categories of Album of the Year, Best Pop Vocal Album, Best Engineered Album – Non-Classical, and Best Pop Performance by a Duo or Group with Vocals (for the single "Cousin Dupree"). For these awards, the band was in competition with younger, more popular recording acts such as NSYNC, Britney Spears, Radiohead, Beck, and Eminem. According to Stereogum writer Zach Schonfeld, Steely Dan's success at the Grammys represented a "revenge of the [baby] boomers" and contributed to resentment among younger listeners toward the band: "[T]he sight of two smug jazz-rock nerds collecting their Grammy from Stevie Wonder as Radiohead and Beck went home nearly empty-handed—helps explain why so many Gen X-ers and old millennials grew up loathing both Steely Dan and the Grammys in equal measure. Needless to say, Steely Dan's elliptical character studies set to yacht rock sleaze didn't speak to disaffected American youth the way, say, The Marshall Mathers LP did."

Steely Dan's supporting tour of North America, Europe, and Japan was equally successful, encouraging them to record the 2003 album Everything Must Go.

Track listing

Personnel

Steely Dan
 Donald Fagen – lead vocals (all tracks), Fender Rhodes (1-3), Clavinet (1), piano (2, 3,8), Wurlitzer (4-7), organ (9)
 Walter Becker – bass (2-7), guitar (1, 2, 4, 6, 7), lead guitar (3, 9)

Additional musicians

 Ted Baker – Fender Rhodes (4, 5, 7-9), piano (9)
 Jon Herington –  rhythm guitar (3, 7-9), acoustic guitar (5)
 Paul Jackson Jr. – guitar (8)
 Hugh McCracken – guitar (5)
 Dean Parks – guitar (8)
 Tom Barney – bass (1, 8, 9)
 Keith Carlock – drums (3)
 Leroy Clouden – drums (4, 5, 7)
 Vinnie Colaiuta – drums (8)
 Sonny Emory – drums (9)
 Ricky Lawson – drums (1)
 Michael White – drums (2, 6)
 Gordon Gottlieb – percussion (2, 3, 5, 6, 9)
 Will Lee – percussion (6)
 Daniel Sadownick – percussion (3), timbales (3)
 Steve Shapiro – vibraphone (3, 8)
 Amy Helm – whistle (7)
 Lawrence Feldman – clarinet (1, 5), tenor saxophone (4, 6), alto saxophone (5), saxophone (3)
 Roy Hitchcock - clarinet (3)
 Lou Marini – alto saxophone (4, 6), tenor saxophone (2)
 Chris Potter – tenor saxophone solo (1, 9), alto saxophone solo (4)
 David Tofani – tenor saxophone (1) saxophone (3)
 Roger Rosenberg – bass clarinet (1, 3-5), baritone saxophone (2, 6)
 Michael Leonhart – trumpet (1-6), Wurlitzer (3, 8)
 Jim Pugh – trombone (1-3, 5, 6)
 Cynthia Calhoun – background vocals (1-3, 6, 8, 9)
 Carolyn Leonhart – background vocals (1-5, 7-9)
 Michael Harvey – background vocals (1-3, 5, 6, 9)

Production

 Producers: Walter Becker, Donald Fagen
 Executive engineer: Roger Nichols
 Engineers: Phil Burnett, Per-Christian Nielsen, Johan Edlund, Anthony Gorman, Roger Nichols, Ken Ross, Dave Russell, Jay A. Ryan, Elliot Scheiner, Peter Scriba
 Mixing: Roger Nichols, Dave Russell
 Mastering: Scott Hull
 Assistants: Suzy Barrows, Reaann Zschokke
 Technician: Roger Nichols
 Editing: Jan Folkson
 Horn arrangements: Walter Becker (1), Donald Fagen (1, 2, 4-6), Michael Leonhart (1, 3)
 Project manager: Jill Dell'Abate
 Project coordinator: Suzana Haugh
 Consultant: Michael Leonhart
 Piano tuner: Sam Berd
 Electric piano technician: Edd Kolakowski
 Design: Carol Bobolts
 Photography: Michael Northrup/Jason Fulford
 Copyist: Michael Leonhart

Charts

Weekly charts

Year-end charts

Certifications

Awards
2001 Grammy Awards

References

Further reading

External links
 Official site
 Complete lyrics
 

2000 albums
Giant Records (Warner) albums
Grammy Award for Best Pop Vocal Album
Grammy Award for Album of the Year
Grammy Award for Best Engineered Album, Non-Classical
Steely Dan albums
Albums produced by Donald Fagen
Albums produced by Walter Becker